Emma Louise Carolyn Flanagan (born 7 January 1991) is an Irish former cricketer who played as a right-handed batter. She appeared in 9 One Day Internationals and 7 Twenty20 Internationals for Ireland between 2011 and 2014. She was also in the Typhoons squad for 2015 Women's Super 3s.

References

External links

1991 births
Living people
Cricketers from County Dublin
Irish women cricketers
Ireland women One Day International cricketers
Ireland women Twenty20 International cricketers
Typhoons (women's cricket) cricketers